The black-faced tanager (Schistochlamys melanopis) is a species of bird in the family Thraupidae.

It is found in Bolivia, Brazil, Colombia, Ecuador, French Guiana, Guyana, Paraguay, Peru, Suriname, and Venezuela. Its natural habitats are subtropical or tropical moist lowland forests, dry savanna, and subtropical or tropical dry shrubland.

References

External links
 Xeno-canto: audio recordings of the black-faced tanager

black-faced tanager
Birds of Colombia
Birds of Venezuela
Birds of the Guianas
Birds of the Peruvian Amazon
Birds of the Bolivian Amazon
Birds of Brazil
black-faced tanager
Birds of the Amazon Basin
Taxonomy articles created by Polbot